Astrapotherium ("lightning beast") is an extinct genus of South American mammals that vaguely resembled a small elephant or large tapir. However, it was unrelated to elephants or tapirs, but was instead related to other extinct South American ungulates. Fossils have been dated from the Early to Middle Miocene. Fossil remains of the type species A. magnus have been found in the Santa Cruz Formation in Argentina. Other fossils have been found in the Deseado, Sarmiento, and Aisol Formations of Argentina and Chile (Cura-Mallín Group).

Description 

It had small plantigrade feet, and the hind limbs were significantly weaker than the fore limbs. Its four canine teeth were elongated to form short tusks, and it had broad, protruding lower incisors, which likely ground against a horny pad in the upper jaw, as in many modern ruminants.

The nostrils were placed high on the head, which might indicate the presence of a trunk, but could equally be due to other reasons, such as an inflatable nasal cavity.

Classification 
Cladogram based in the phylogenetic analysis published by Vallejo-Pareja et al., 2015, showing the position of Astrapotherium:

Paleobiology 
The animal was probably at least partially aquatic, living in shallow water and feeding on marsh plants in a similar manner to a modern hippopotamus.

References

External links 

 "Astrapotherium" (Picture library, Natural History Museum, London)

Meridiungulata
Miocene mammals of South America
Oligocene mammals of South America
Colloncuran
Friasian
Santacrucian
Colhuehuapian
Deseadan
Neogene Argentina
Paleogene Argentina
Fossils of Argentina
Neogene Chile
Fossils of Chile
Fossil taxa described in 1879
Taxa named by Hermann Burmeister
Prehistoric placental genera
Golfo San Jorge Basin
Sarmiento Formation
Austral or Magallanes Basin
Santa Cruz Formation